The 1994 Champion Hurdle was a horse race held at Cheltenham Racecourse on Tuesday 15 March 1994. It was the 65th running of the Champion Hurdle.

The winner was J. T. Price's Flakey Dove, an eight-year-old bay mare trained in Herefordshire by Richard Price and ridden by Mark Dwyer. Flakey Dove's victory was a first in the race for jockey, trainer and owner and the third in the race for a female racehorse after African Sister in 1939 and Dawn Run in 1984.

Flakey Dove was a non-Thoroughbred mare, who had made steady improvement since finishing seventh in the 1993 Champion Hurdle an emerged as a legitimate contender for the following year's renewal with wins in the Champion Hurdle Trial, Cleeve Hurdle and Berkshire Hurdle in early 1994. Starting at odds of 9/1 she won the Champion Hurdle by one and a half lengths from the favourite Oh So Risky with Large Action in third place. Two previous winners of the race took part: Granville Again finished seventh, whilst Morley Street was pulled up after four hurdles. Eleven of the fifteen runners completed the course.

Race details
 Sponsor: Smurfit
 Purse: £166,742; First prize: £99,933
 Going: Good to Soft
 Distance: 2 miles 110 yards
 Number of runners: 15
 Winner's time: 4m 02.30

Full result

 Abbreviations: nse = nose; nk = neck; hd = head; dist = distance; UR = unseated rider; PU = pulled up; LFT = left at start; SU = slipped up; BD = brought down

Winner's details
Further details of the winner, Flakey Dove
 Sex: Mare
 Foaled: 1986
 Country: United Kingdom
 Sire: Oats; Dam: Shadey Dove (Deadly Nightshade)
 Owner: J. T. Price
 Breeder: J. T. Price

References

Champion Hurdle
 1994
Champion Hurdle
Champion Hurdle
1990s in Gloucestershire